The Max Planck Institute for Physics (MPP) is a physics institute in Munich, Germany that specializes in high energy physics and astroparticle physics. It is part of the Max-Planck-Gesellschaft and is also known as the Werner Heisenberg Institute, after its first director in its current location.

The founding of the institute traces back to 1914, as an idea from Fritz Haber, Walther Nernst, Max Planck, Emil Warburg, Heinrich Rubens. On October 1, 1917, the institute was officially founded in Berlin as Kaiser-Wilhelm-Institut für Physik (KWIP, Kaiser Wilhelm Institute for Physics) with Albert Einstein as the first head director. In October 1922, Max von Laue succeeded Einstein as managing director. Einstein gave up his position as a director of the institute in April 1933. The Institute took part in the German nuclear weapon project from 1939 to 1942.

In June 1942, Werner Heisenberg took over as managing director. A year after the end of fighting in Europe in World War II, the institute was moved to Göttingen and renamed the Max Planck Institute for Physics, with Heisenberg continuing as managing director. In 1946, Carl Friedrich von Weizsäcker and Karl Wirtz joined the faculty as the directors for theoretical and experimental physics, respectively.

In 1955 the institute made the decision to move to Munich, and soon after began construction of its current building, designed by Sep Ruf. The institute moved into its current location on September 1, 1958, and took on the new name the Max Planck Institute for Physics and Astrophysics, still with Heisenberg as the managing director. In 1991, the institute was split into the Max Planck Institute for Physics, the Max Planck Institute for Astrophysics and the Max Planck Institute for Extraterrestrial Physics.

Structure 
There are three departments with multiple research groups:

 Structure of matter
Innovative calculation methods in particle physics (Giulia Zanderighi)
Quantum field theory and scattering amplitudes (Johannes Henn)
String theory (Dieter Lüst)
ATLAS detector (Siegfried Bethke)
Belle II experiment (Hans-Günther Moser)
Gravitational theory (Angnis Schmidt-May)
New technologies
AWAKE – Plasma Wakefield Acceleration (Patric Muggli)
ILC and CLIC: Linear Colliders (Frank Simon)
Astroparticle physics
Particle physics and cosmology (Georgi Dvali)
Theoretical astroparticle physics (Georg G. Raffelt)
CRESST experiment (Federica Petricca)
GERDA and LEGEND: the nature of the neutrino (Allen Caldwell)
KATRIN and TRISTAN: Neutrinos and dark matter (Susanne Mertens)
MADMAX experiment: searching for axion dark matter (Béla Majorovits)
MAGIC and CTA: Gamma ray telescopes (Masahiro Teshima)

Current and former directors 
The current directorial board of the institute is
 Siegfried Bethke
 Allen Caldwell 
 Giorgi Dvali
 Johannes Henn
 Dieter Lüst (current managing director)
 Masahiro Teshima
 Giulia Zanderighi

Former directors of the institute include:
 Ludwig Biermann
 Heinz Billing
 Gerd Buschhorn
 Peter Debye
 Hans-Peter Dürr
 Albert Einstein
 Gerhard von Gierke
 Fritz Haber
 Werner Heisenberg
 Leon Van Hove
 Max von Laue
 Walther Nernst
 Max Planck
 Heinrich Rubens
 Norbert Schmitz
 Leo Stodolsky
 Emil Warburg
 Carl Friedrich von Weizsäcker
 Karl Wirtz

References

External links 
 Homepage of the Max Planck Institute for Physics

Education in Munich
Physics
Physics institutes
1917 establishments in Germany